Port Loyola Calvary Chapel is a Calvary Chapel Fellowship in Belize City, Belize. The church was founded on October 31, 2004, by Pastor Joel Meyer.

References
Official site

Buildings and structures in Belize City
Churches in Belize City